The Ústí nad Labem Half Marathon is an annual half marathon race which takes place in September in Ústí nad Labem, Czech Republic. Known as the Mattoni Ústí Half Marathon, it is a part of RunCzech running circuit.

The course winds through Ústí nad Labem city centre on both banks of Labe river and also through Spolchemie chemical plant. The inaugural edition of the event was held in 2011. In 2013, almost 3 000 runners participated in the race.

The course records are held by Kenya's Barselius Kipyego and Peres Jepchirchir.

Past winners

Key:

References

External links

 Ústí nad Labem Half Marathon official website

Half marathons
Athletics competitions in the Czech Republic
Recurring sporting events established in 2011
Sport in Ústí nad Labem
Autumn events in the Czech Republic